Permanent Portfolio Family  is an American mutual fund investment company founded in 1982. The company's products consist of four mutual funds.  Its flagship fund, the Permanent Portfolio, is based on the investment strategies of Harry Browne.

History
The company was established in 1982 and its first offering was a mutual fund called the Permanent Portfolio (PRPFX).  The Short-Term Treasury Portfolio (PRTBX) was founded in 1987. A stock fund called Aggressive Growth Portfolio (PAGRX) was opened in 1990 and Michael Cuggino was hired to manage it.   In 1991, the company added the Versatile Bond Portfolio (PRVBX) which invests  80% or more of its net assets in bonds. Cuggino, a Certified Public Accountant took control of the Permanent Portfolio fund in 2003 when his predecessor was sanctioned by the Securities and Exchange Commission.  Other company leaders include: James H. Andrews as Treasurer, Susan K. Freund as Chief Compliance Officer and Derek D. Hyatt as their Senior Investment Analyst.

Products

Permanent Portfolio fund
The company's flagship fund was established in 1982 by Terry Coxan and John Chandler and "mimicked an early version of the permanent portfolio concept" of Browne. According to Kiplinger's Personal Finance magazine
it was designed to neutralize high inflation by investing in precious metals, Swiss bonds, U.S. Treasury bills and natural resource stocks. This was similar to Browne's strategy of  25% of a portfolio in bonds, stocks, cash and gold with annual re-balancing. Browne's strategy was portrayed as a "fail-safe" investment strategy and was outlined in his 1999 book Fail-Safe Investing. The Permanent Portfolio mutual fund, however, is more complex than Browne's original concept and has six asset categories. The fund aims to invest in a fixed percentage of uncorrelated, asset categories to minimize risk in changing economic climates. These include 35% in government bonds, 25% in gold and silver bullion, 15% in growth stocks, 10% in cash and Swiss francs and 15% in energy, mining, and real estate stocks.  The funds concept is to "preserve capital and provide low risk growth" through diversification. From 1982 through 2008, the fund's assets under management (AUM) were less than $50 million but they grew to $1 billion in 2007,  $3.4 billion in 2008 and $5 billion in 2009. As of 2012  the fund had $17 billion in assets under management with 20% invested in gold bullion  and a "relatively high" 0.71% annual management fee.

In the 1990s the fund had poor shareholder retention as it "badly trailed" most stock funds.  However, between Feb. 2, 2001 and February 2, 2011, the fund averaged an 11 percent annualized return in comparison to a 1.6 percent annualized return for the S&P 500 index. When the S&P 500 index dropped 37% in the financial crisis of 2008,  the Permanent Portfolio fund lost 8%.  However, from its 1982 inception through 2010, the fund had average annual gains of 6.5% in comparison to the S&P 500 stock index's 10.6% average annual gain over the same period. The 2012 book The Permanent Portfolio: Harry Browne's Long-Term Investment Strategy discusses the funds benefits and limitations. The authors say that the fund manager's investment decisions and the costs associated with an actively managed mutual fund are a downside when compared to an index fund, but points out that the fund's management fee of 0.78% per year is below the mutual fund average. According to a 2006 article in Kiplinger's personal finance magazine the fund has delivered on its goal of "long term stability with occasional market beating returns."

Aggressive Growth Portfolio
The Aggressive Growth Portfolio (PAGRX) is described as a "diversified, multi-cap core, U.S. equity fund" with the goal of long term appreciation. In 2002 it had $24 million in assets under management and consisted of large and mid-sized companies. In the ten years prior to March 2002 it ranked #34 amongst 797 other diversified mutual funds and had a stock management turnover rate of 6%. During that period it never had a negative year and its average annual gain was 2% better than the S&P 500 Index. In 2002 its annual management fee was 1.29%.

Other
The company also offers a Short-Term Treasury Portfolio (PRTBX) which it describes as a short-term U.S. Treasury bonds fund. The firm's  Versatile Bond Portfolio (PRVBX)  is said to invest  80% or more of its net assets in bonds.

See also
Fail-Safe Investing

References

External links
Official web site

Financial services companies established in 1982
1982 establishments in California
Companies based in San Francisco
Mutual funds of the United States